Yelena Nikolaevna Miroshina (5 June 1974 – 18 December 1995) was a Russian diver, best known for twice winning the gold medal at the European Championships in the 10 m platform, and winning Olympic silver in 1992, where in the final she progressed from 8th place after 4 jumps to second.

Miroshina competed in two consecutive Summer Olympics, and represented two countries: the Soviet Union (1988) and the Unified Team (1992). She was affiliated with Spartak during her career. Miroshina was the youngest participant among the 89 (49 men and 40 women) competitors from 31 countries at the Seoul Games, with 14 years and 105 days.

Miroshina retired from competitions in 1995. The same year she was found dead under the windows of her apartment in Moscow. She was pregnant at the time of her death. The cause of death remains unknown.

See also
 List of divers

References

Soviet female divers
Russian female divers
Divers at the 1988 Summer Olympics
Divers at the 1992 Summer Olympics
Olympic divers of the Soviet Union
Olympic silver medalists for the Unified Team
Divers from Moscow
1974 births
1995 suicides
Suicides by jumping in Russia
Olympic medalists in diving
Olympic divers of the Unified Team
Medalists at the 1992 Summer Olympics
World Aquatics Championships medalists in diving